The 1933 Wisconsin milk strike was a series of strikes conducted by a cooperative group of Wisconsin dairy farmers in an attempt to raise the price of milk paid to producers during the Great Depression. Three main strike periods occurred in 1933, with length of time and level of violence increased during each one.

The cooperative milk pool attempted to coordinate their efforts with larger farm groups, specifically the National Farm Holiday Association and Wisconsin Farmers' Holiday Association. However, during each strike, the larger farm holiday groups ended their strikes prematurely leaving the milk pool to conduct its strike alone.

Rationale

Wisconsin's Past and Present lists the price of evaporated milk from 1927 to 1929 as $4.79 / 100 lb with 46% to farmers, 33% to manufacturers and 21% to merchandisers. That price fell to an average of $3.48 / 100 lb, with individual farmers receiving a smaller percentage of the proceeds: 30.5% to farmers, 43% to manufacturers and 26.5% to merchandisers between 1930 and 1933. This decrease, combined with inflation during the Depression, put small farmers in an extremely difficult position. Farmers who produced milk for bottling were able to remain solvent, but those who produced milk for cheese, butter and other uses were driven into poverty. The price of milk that was going to urban areas for bottling was around $1.50 for a hundred pounds while the milk going to cheese and butter factories was only getting $0.85 for a hundred pounds of milk. This created a kind of civil war between the two types of dairy farmers. Milk to be bottled was largely unaffected by the strikes.

In the 1930s, Wisconsin was the largest producer of milk in the United States. According to the 1930 decennial census, there were more than 125,000 dairy farms in the state. 63% of all land in Wisconsin was farmland and 71% of that land was used for dairy farming.

Methods employed in the strikes were initially to simply not sell milk unless a previously agreed upon price of $1.50 per hundred pounds had been met. When the strikers realized they were grossly outnumbered and that some of the members were selling at a reduced price, they resorted to roadblocks to prevent milk deliveries to the manufacturers. Fixed road blocks were established and trucks were turned back if they contained milk. If they refused to turn back, the strikers forcibly dumped the milk at the roadside. In the early strikes, the deliveries simply took alternate routes to avoid the fixed roadblocks. During later strikes, the strikers took to the roads in search of delivery trucks and forced them to turn back as they were found. When they couldn't stop the deliveries, the strikers sometimes resorted to tainting the delivered milk with kerosene or oil, or in a few cases, throwing bombs at the creameries.

The state attempted to get milk to market by breaking up the road blocks or escorting convoys carrying milk to their destinations. Tear gas was employed to disburse larger groups of strikers and in one instance guardsmen with fixed bayonets forced farmers from their position. Railways and interurban trains were used to bypass the roadblocks, but some rail lines were blocked by strikers and at least one freight yard was infiltrated resulting in the dumping of the milk in the yard.

At this time there were other farmer organizations in different Mid-Western states that had already been protesting the rise in dairy prices and other farm problems. These farmers leagues had a lot to do with the "Farmers Holiday" organization that emerged in 1932 and 1933 in certain areas that worked with another organization called The United Farmers League that was a communist led group that formed in 1930 and 1931 that worked with Farmers Holiday. The Farm Holiday Association had done strikes related to other areas of agriculture related industries such as strikes on livestock in different states and trying to keep farmers in different states on the same side of boycotts and protests. Farmers Holiday had a larger impact in the Wisconsin milk strikes by doing milk strikes in other states around the same time and attempting to coordinate strikes to be more affect across state lines targeting certain cities.

February strike
The first set of strikes ran from February 15 to 22. They were mainly confined to strike strongholds centered on the area controlled by the Wisconsin Cooperative Milk Pool, led by Walter M. Singler, in the Fox Valley.
 
The first blood shed in the strike was reported to be near Appleton, Wisconsin, when milk convoy guards threw heavy objects like horse shoes at a group of 100 strikers.

May strike
The second in the series of strikes ran from May 13 to 19. These strikes spread to a larger part of Wisconsin and resulted in more violence than the February strike.

In Shawano County, the Journal sentinel reported 30 people were injured when National Guardsmen, sworn in as deputies charged with keeping the roads open, and pickets "engaged in a pitched battle" in front of a dairy plant. "The strikers won the skirmish, dumping the milk and driving the deputies to cover by throwing back their own tear gas bombs," the Journal Sentinel reported on May 15, 1933.

National Guardsmen with fixed bayonets and tear gas forced pickets from Durham Hill in Waukesha County, May 16, 1933.

 of milk was deliberately tainted with kerosene at a creamery near Farmington in Jefferson County.

On May 16, a guardsman shot two teenagers, killing one of them, after they failed to stop their vehicle in Racine County.

On May 18, a farmer in his 50s was killed when he fell or was pushed from the running board of a milk delivery truck after it left a picket road block between Saukville and Grafton in Ozaukee County.

On May 19, the milk pool received a temporary peace with the state government in Madison to discuss options to end the strikes. The five points the milk pool wanted examined were: First, to recall the National Guard away from protests. Second, followed by abolition of the two-price system for milk. Third, the reorganization of Department of Agriculture. Fourth, the prohibition against chain stores manufacturing and processing of food to make them weaker. And, fifth, being recognition for the organization of dairy farmers.

October-to-November strike
The third series of strikes ran from October 21 to November 18 and a larger portion of Wisconsin was affected by them.

Creameries near Plymouth and Fond du Lac, Wisconsin were bombed around November 1, 1933. A cheese factory near Belgium, Ozaukee County, Wisconsin was dynamited and burned, the 4th of the week. Creameries in Krakow and Zachow, in Shawano County, Wisconsin, were bombed Friday, November 3, 1933. In all, seven creameries were bombed and thousands of pounds of milk were dumped.

On October 28, 1933, a 60-year-old farmer was killed at a picket line in the Town of Burke, Wisconsin after a single bullet was fired into the crowd by a passenger in a car stopped by the crowd. The farmer killed had not been part of the picket and was there delivering food to the strikers. The shooter had been angered over a headlight a striker had broken while the shooter's vehicle was running the picket line earlier in the night. The shooter was later sentenced to two to four years in prison after pleading guilty to manslaughter charges.

Aftermath
Local newspapers reported that farmers lost $10 million during the strikes. After 1933, Singler's Cooperative Milk Pool purchased creameries to help increase the profits of its members, but the milk pool later faded into obscurity. The economy eventually improved, helping smaller farmers to earn more money, but it is not clear if the strikes aided this recovery.

Notable individuals involved
Walter M. Singler, head of the Wisconsin Cooperative Milk Pool
Wisconsin Governor Albert G. Schmedeman
Milo Reno, National Farm Holiday Association president
Arnold Gilberts, president of the Wisconsin Farmers' Holiday Association

See also
Iowa Cow War
National Farmers Organization
Aaron Sapiro
Milk quota
Wisconsin dairy industry

References

Further reading
 Jacobs, Herbert. "The Wisconsin Milk Strikes". Wisconsin Magazine of History, vol. 35, no. 1 (Autumn, 1951):30–35.
 Luoma, Everett E.: The Farmer Takes A Holiday: The Story of the National Farmers' Holiday Association and the Farmers' Strike of 1932–1933. New York: Exposition Press, 1967.
 Wisconsin Cartographers' Guild. Wisconsin's Past and Present. Madison: University of Wisconsin Press, 1998.

External links
1930 Decennial Census, 125,301 Dairy farms in the state of Wisconsin. 181,767 total farms of all types.
 of Dairy farmland,  for farms of all types.  of land in Wisconsin. (44.9% of all land was Dairy farmland and 71.4% of all farm land was dairy farmland.)
Average dairy farm size , avg farm size .
Number of cows and heifers kept mainly for milk on dairy farms, 1,533,955
Milk sold by dairy farms, .  per cow (dairy farms only),  produced by non-dairy farms.
Labor costs for dairy farms, $21,572,710
1930 census 1929 Agriculture data tables
 "A Brutal and Calllous Murder," Capital Times, Madison, Wisconsin, October 1933.

Wisconsin Milk Strike, 1933
Economy of Wisconsin
Labor disputes in Wisconsin
History of agriculture in the United States
Agriculture in Wisconsin
History of Wisconsin
Dairy farming in the United States
1933 in Wisconsin
Agriculture and forestry labor disputes in the United States